Judge Tuttle may refer to:

Arthur J. Tuttle (1868–1944), judge of the United States District Court for the Eastern District of Michigan
Elbert Tuttle (1897–1996), judge of the United States Court of Appeals for the Fifth Circuit